Lake Mackenzie is a lake in the Central Highlands area of Tasmania, Australia.  The lake is formed by a dam and is part of Tasmania's hydro electric scheme operated by Hydro Tasmania.

Water from Lake Mackenzie flows via canals, tunnels and pipes to the Fisher Power Station. The water drops 650 metres to Fisher then runs into Lake Parangana.

The area surrounding the lake was affected by the January 2016 Tasmanian bushfires.

References

Mackenzie
Central Highlands (Tasmania)
2016 Tasmanian bushfires